Corey J. Atkins (born November 11, 1976) is a former American football linebacker who played one season with the Atlanta Falcons of the National Football League. He also played for the Barcelona Dragons of NFL Europe for one season.

References 

1976 births
Living people

American football linebackers
Atlanta Falcons players
Barcelona Dragons players
Sportspeople from Greenville, South Carolina
Players of American football from South Carolina
South Carolina Gamecocks football players